The 1859 New South Wales colonial election was held between 9 June and 7 July 1859. This election was for all of the 80 seats in the New South Wales Legislative Assembly and it was conducted in 58 single-member constituencies, seven 2-member constituencies and two 4-member constituencies, all with a first past the post system. Suffrage was limited to adult white males. The previous parliament of New South Wales was dissolved on 11 April 1859 by the Governor, Sir William Denison, on the advice of the Premier, Charles Cowper.

There was no recognisable party structure at this election; instead the government was determined by a loose, shifting factional system.

Key dates

Results

{{Australian elections/Title row
| table style = float:right;clear:right;margin-left:1em;
| title        = New South Wales colonial election, 9 June 1859 – 7 July 1859
| house        = Legislative Assembly
| series       = New South Wales colonial election
| back         = 1858
| forward      = 1860
| enrolled     = 78,231
| total_votes  = 52,153
| turnout %    = 52.54
| turnout chg  = +9.45
| informal     = 26
| informal %   = 0.08
| informal chg = +0.08
}}

|}

References

See also
 Members of the New South Wales Legislative Assembly, 1859–1860
 Candidates of the 1859 New South Wales colonial election

1859 New South Wales Colonial Election
1859 elections in Australia
1859 New South Wales Colonial Election
June 1859 events
July 1859 events